Marie-Agnes Strack-Zimmermann ( Jahn, born 10 March 1958) is a German politician of the Free Democratic Party (FDP) who has been serving as a member of the Bundestag from the state of North Rhine-Westphalia since 2017.

Early life and career 
Strack-Zimmermann studied journalism, political science and German language and literature at the Ludwig Maximilian University of Munich (LMU) and graduated with a Master of Arts degree. In 1986, she received her doctorate at the LMU with a thesis entitled Bilder aus Amerika: eine zeitungswissenschaftliche Studie über die USA-Berichterstattung im Zweiten Deutschen Fernsehen (ZDF) (Images from America: a newspaper science study on US reporting on ZDF).

From 1988 to 2008 Strack-Zimmermann worked for the medium-sized Nuremberg youth book publisher Tessloff. Later she was a freelance publishing house representative.

Political career

Career in local politics
Strack-Zimmermann was a member of the Düsseldorf city council from 2004 to 2023. From 2008 until 2014, she served as deputy mayor of Düsseldorf, alongside mayor Dirk Elbers.

Deputy Chair of the FDP, 2013–2019
Following the election of Christian Lindner as chairman of the FDP in 2013, Strack-Zimmermann became one of his deputies. She served as part of the party's leadership until 2019, when she was succeeded by Nicola Beer.

Member of the German Parliament, 2017–present
Strack-Zimmermann became a member of the Bundestag in the 2017 German federal election.

During her first term from 2017 to 2021, Strack-Zimmermann served on the Defence Committee and the Committee for Construction, Housing, Urban Development and Local Authorities. During that time, she was her parliamentary group's spokesperson for defence policy and spokesperson for local government policy. Since 2021, Strack-Zimmermann has been serving as chairwoman of the Defence Committee.

In addition to her committee assignments, Strack-Zimmermann has been a member of the German delegation to the NATO Parliamentary Assembly since 2018, where she is part of the Defence and Security Committee, the Political Committee, the Sub-Committee on Transatlantic Defence and Security Cooperation and the Sub-Committee on Transatlantic Relations.

In the negotiations to form a so-called traffic light coalition of the Social Democratic Party (SPD), the Green Party and the FDP following the 2021 federal elections, Strack-Zimmermann was part of her party's delegation in the working group on foreign policy, defence, development cooperation and human rights, co-chaired by Heiko Maas, Omid Nouripour and Alexander Graf Lambsdorff.

In her capacity as chair of the defense committee, Strack-Zimmermann visited Ukraine shortly after the 2022 Russian invasion with Michael Roth and Anton Hofreiter, the chairs of parliament's foreign relations and European affairs committees respectively.

In 2023, Strack-Zimmermann was one of the initiators – alongside Michelle Müntefering and Agnieszka Brugger – of a cross-party group promoting a feminist foreign policy.

Other activities 
 Federal Academy for Security Policy (BAKS), Member of the advisory board (since 2018)
 Förderkreis Deutsches Heer (FKH), Member
 Deutsche Gesellschaft für Wehrtechnik (German society for defense technics, DWT), Member
 FOM University of Applied Sciences for Economics and Management Düsseldorf, Member of the Board of Trustees
 Rotary International, Member
 Fortuna Düsseldorf, Member

References

External links 

  
 Bundestag biography 
 

 

1958 births
Living people
Politicians from Düsseldorf
Members of the Bundestag for North Rhine-Westphalia
Female members of the Bundestag
21st-century German women politicians
Members of the Bundestag 2017–2021
Members of the Bundestag 2021–2025
Members of the Bundestag for the Free Democratic Party (Germany)